"I Need You" is a song recorded by American country music artist Trisha Yearwood.  It was released March 1997 as the third single from the album Everybody Knows.  The song reached #36 on the Billboard Hot Country Singles & Tracks chart.  The song was written by Jess Brown and Wendell Mobley.

Chart performance

References

1997 singles
1997 songs
Trisha Yearwood songs
Songs written by Jess Brown
Songs written by Wendell Mobley
Song recordings produced by Garth Fundis
MCA Records singles